Naomi Long may refer to:

 Naomi Long (born 1971), Northern Irish politician
 Naomi Long Madgett (born 1923), African-American poet

See also
 Naomi Lang, American ice dancer
 Virginia and Naomi Leong